Huang Xiaomin (born April 14, 1970) is a Chinese former breaststroke swimmer, whose best performance during her career was winning the silver medal in the 200 m breaststroke at the 1988 Summer Olympics in Seoul, South Korea. She was born in Qiqihar, Heilongjiang. She admitted to have used doping substances during her active career and is now publicly opposed to it.

References

External links
Athlete Profile at DatabaseOlympics.com

1970 births
Living people
Chinese female breaststroke swimmers
Swimmers from Heilongjiang
Olympic silver medalists for China
Olympic swimmers of China
Sportspeople from Qiqihar
Swimmers at the 1988 Summer Olympics
Asian Games medalists in swimming
Swimmers at the 1986 Asian Games
Swimmers at the 1990 Asian Games
Medalists at the 1988 Summer Olympics
Olympic silver medalists in swimming
Asian Games gold medalists for China
Asian Games silver medalists for China
Medalists at the 1986 Asian Games
Medalists at the 1990 Asian Games
20th-century Chinese women